The Shire of Mirboo was a local government area about  southeast of Melbourne, the state capital of Victoria, Australia.

History

Mirboo was first incorporated as a shire out of parts of the East and West Ridings of the Shire of Narracan, and the East Riding of the Shire of Woorayl, on 13 April 1894. It annexed parts of the Boolarra and Yinnar Ridings of the Shire of Morwell on 11 December 1916. It annexed further parts of Woorayl on 31 May 1922, and Narracan on 21 March 1990.

On 2 December 1994, the Shire of Mirboo was abolished, and along with the Shire of South Gippsland and parts of the Shires of Korumburra and Woorayl, was merged into the new Shire of South Gippsland.

Ridings
Mirboo was unsubdivided, and its nine councillors represented the entire shire.

Towns and localities
 Allambee East
 Allambee South
 Berrys Creek
 Darlmurla
 Delburn
 Limonite
 Mardan
 Mirboo North*

* Council seat.

Population

* Estimate in the 1958 Victorian Year Book.

References

External links
 Victorian Places - Mirboo Shire

Mirboo